The 2023 USL W League Two season is the 2nd season for the league. The regular season begins on May 6 and will end on July 2.

Team changes

New teams

Academica SC (Turlock, CA)
Bavarian United SC (Milwaukee, WI)
Birmingham Legion W League
California Storm (Sacramento, CA)
Capital FC Atletica (Salem, OR)
Cleveland Force SC
FC Carolinas (Waxhaws, NC)
Lane United FC (Eugene, OR)
Lexington SC
Marin FC Siren (Greenbrae, CA)
North Alabama SC (Huntsville, AL)
Oakland Soul SC
Olympic Club SC (San Francisco, CA)

Oly Town FC (Olympia, WA)
Paisley Athletic FC (Kearny, NJ)
Palm City Americanas (Palm City, FL)
PDX FC (Portland, OR)
Pleasanton RAGE (Pleasanton, CA)
RKC Soccer Club (Racine & Kenosha, WI)
Rochester FC (Rochester, MN)
St. Charles FC (St. Charles, MO)
San Francisco Glens
Stockton Cargo SC (Stockton, CA)
Swan City SC (Lakeland, FL)
United PDX (Portland, OR)
Virginia Marauders FC (Winchester, VA)

Departing teams
Caledonia SC
Kaw Valley FC
Peachtree City MOBA
Queensboro FC
St. Louis Lions

Standings

Eastern Conference

Metropolitan Division

Mid Atlantic Division

Central Conference

Great Lakes Division

Heartland Division

Valley Division

Southern Conference

South Atlantic Division

South Central Division

Southeast Division

Western Conference

Northwest Division

Nor Cal Division

References

External links
 USL W League website

2023
2023 in American soccer leagues
2023 in Canadian soccer